James Scrymagour Crapnell (4 June 1903 – 24 December 1991) was a Scottish football player and manager. He played as a right back for Airdrieonians and Motherwell at club level, and represented both Scotland and the Scottish League XI.

Career
Crapnell, who was born in Paisley, began his club career in the junior leagues with Cambuslang Rangers. He was already 23 when he moved to Airdrie in 1926 as a replacement for Alex Dick who had been advised to stop playing, but within three years he had become the Diamonds club captain and achieved international recognition, receiving all of his caps while with Airdrie.

Motherwell signed him in January 1933 for a fee of £2,000. He helped them reach the 1933 Scottish Cup Final, but they lost 1–0 to Celtic. He retired in 1934 to try a career in insurance. After a brief comeback in the Motherwell reserve team, he retired again.

Crapnell was 5 feet 5 inches tall, which was small for a defender. He had a "reputation for tenacity", however, and won nine Scotland caps between 1929 and 1933, only finishing on the losing side once and captaining the team in four of those appearances. He is the most capped player in Airdrieonians' history. Crapnell also represented the Scottish League XI five times (all victories) between 1929 and 1932.

Crapnell became a manager after the Second World War, working for Alloa Athletic and then St Johnstone. He died in December 1991, aged 88.

See also
List of Scotland national football team captains

References

1903 births
1991 deaths
Footballers from Paisley, Renfrewshire
Scottish footballers
Scottish football managers
Cambuslang Rangers F.C. players
Airdrieonians F.C. (1878) players
Motherwell F.C. players
Alloa Athletic F.C. managers
St Johnstone F.C. managers
Scottish Football League players
Scottish Junior Football Association players
Scottish Football League representative players
Scotland international footballers
Association football fullbacks
Scottish Football League managers